Woga may refer to:

 Edmund Woga (born 1950), Indonesian Roman Catholic bishop
 Woga or Lamang language
 WOGA (FM)
 Woga (album) by Charles Kynard
 World Olympic Gymnastics Academy